Paul-Albert Bartholomé was a French painter and sculptor. He was born on 29 August 1848 in Thiverval-Grignon, Yvelines, France, and died in 1928 in Paris. He won the Grand Prize for sculpture at the Exposition Universelle in 1900. He exhibited paintings at the Salon from 1879 to 1886, but thereafter devoted his work to sculpture.

Biography

He studied law and fought in the Franco-Prussian War in General Bourbaki's army and became a prisoner in Switzerland.  In due course he attended the École des Beaux-Arts in Paris where he studied painting under Barthélemy Menn and Jean-Léon Gérôme. He then set himself up in a studio in Paris and became a close friend of Edgar Degas. He married the daughter of a marquis, Prospérie de Fleury, but she died at a young age in 1887.

Much encouraged by Degas he decided to try his hand at sculpture and executed the moving sculpture which marked his wife's grave in Crépy-en-Valois. He now concentrated exclusively on sculpture and from 1891 onwards he exhibited each year at the yearly Salon of the Société nationale des Beaux-arts.  Funerary sculpture was very much in vogue in France at that time and much of Bartholomé's is death related and his masterpiece is the monument in Père Lachaise Cemetery dedicated to all the dead.

He was to work on this for ten years and the inauguration took place in 1899.  The "Monument the Dead" is disturbing and involves twenty one larger than life size figures all showing different emotions and reactions to death.  There is little sentiment in this composition which is uncompromising, secular and human, although there is an inference that a "light" will defeat the darkness, with the inscription:  As a painter he was said to be influenced by Jules Bastien-Lepage.

Main works

Images of the Père-Lachaise – Monument aux morts

Main works (continued)

Note

In 1924 Bartholome executed a monument to Victorien Sardou which was erected by a public fountain in the Place de la Madeleine. In bronze the sculpture depicted a seated Sardou and behind him were allegories of comedy and drama. In 1941 the Germans had the monument dismantled so that the bronze could be melted down and reused.

Gallery of images

See also
War memorials (Aisne)- See Soissons entry
War memorials (Oise)-See entry on Monument aux Morts at Crépy-en-Valois

References

External links

 Albert Bartholomé in Artcyclopedia
 

1848 births
1928 deaths
19th-century French painters
20th-century French painters
20th-century French male artists
French male painters
People from Yvelines
19th-century French sculptors
20th-century French sculptors
French male sculptors
Members of the Ligue de la patrie française
Commandeurs of the Légion d'honneur
Burials at Père Lachaise Cemetery
Honorary Members of the Royal Academy
19th-century French male artists